The 2013–14 season was the club's first season in the newly formed Scottish Premiership and their eighth consecutive appearance in the top flight of Scottish football. St Mirren  also competed in the League Cup and the Scottish Cup.

Summary
St Mirren finished eighth in the inaugural Scottish Premiership season. They reached the Fifth Round of the Scottish Cup, and crashed out as holders of the League Cup in the Second Round.

Results and fixtures

Pre season

Scottish Premiership

Scottish League Cup

Scottish Cup

Player statistics

Captains

Squad information
Last updated 10 May 2014

|}

Disciplinary record
Includes all competitive matches.
Last updated 10 May 2014

Team statistics

League table

Division summary

Transfers

Players in

Players out

See also
List of St Mirren F.C. seasons

References

St Mirren F.C. seasons
St Mirren